Perideridia is a genus of plants in the family Apiaceae. Plants in this genus are known generally as yampah or yampa. They are native to western North America. Similar in appearance to other plants of the family Apiaceae, they have umbels of white flowers.

Name
The genus is based on the Greek word perideri, meaning 'necklace'.

Description
The plants have a unique appearance for members of the parsley family, and are tall (1–3 feet) and grasslike, with threadlike leaves 1–6 inches long that resemble blades of grass. The plants effectively mimic tall grass and are virtually invisible until they flower, since they tend to grow in grassy meadows, and prefer full sunlight. Like most members of the parsley family, yampah produces umbels of white flowers. The small roots of yampah are about the size of a large unshelled peanut.

Distribution and habitat

Uses

Plains Indians named the plant 'Yampah' and consumed its starchy bulbs, some of which taste like carrots.

Perideridia gairdneri was an important staple crop of Native Americans in Western North America. The nutlike roots of the plant are crunchy and mildly sweet, and resemble  water chestnuts in texture and flavor.

Yampah roots were either baked or steamed, and were reported to have excellent flavor and nutritional qualities. The seeds of yampah were used as a seasoning and resemble caraway seeds in flavor. Yampah roots contain rapidly assimilatable carbohydrates, and were used by hunters and runners as a high energy food to enhance physical endurance.

Uncooked yampah roots are a gentle laxative if consumed in excess and were used medicinally for this purpose.

It resembles the highly toxic poison hemlock and water hemlock.

Species

References

External links
USDA Plants Profile
Jepson Manual Treatment

 
Apioideae genera
Edible Apiaceae